A concourse is a place where pathways or roads meet.

Concourse may also refer to:

 Concourse, Bronx - a neighborhood in the West Bronx.
 Concourse (newspaper), the student newspaper at Keele University
 Concourse Program at MIT
 Concourse at Landmark Center, in Atlanta
 The Concourse, in Singapore
 The Concourse, Chatswood

See also
 Winter Street Concourse, in Boston
 Music Concourse, in San Francisco
 Concourse on High, Bahá'í concept
 Grand Concourse (disambiguation)
 Concours (disambiguation)